Supaporn Hubson (born 1 September 1975) is a Thai sprinter. She competed in the women's 4 × 100 metres relay at the 1996 Summer Olympics.

References

1975 births
Living people
Athletes (track and field) at the 1996 Summer Olympics
Supaporn Hubson
Supaporn Hubson
Place of birth missing (living people)
Olympic female sprinters